Hendrik Jan Wolter  (15 July 1873 – 29 October 1952) was a Dutch painter. His work was part of the painting event in the art competition at the 1924 Summer Olympics. Wolter's work was included in the 1939 exhibition and sale Onze Kunst van Heden (Our Art of Today) at the Rijksmuseum in Amsterdam.

References

External links
images of Wolter's art on ArtNet

1873 births
1952 deaths
19th-century Dutch painters
20th-century Dutch painters
Dutch male painters
Olympic competitors in art competitions
Painters from Amsterdam
19th-century Dutch male artists
20th-century Dutch male artists